Vermont Route 143 (VT 143) is a  state highway within the town of Springfield in Windsor County, Vermont, United States. It connects VT 11 in Springfield to U.S. Route 5 (US 5) in Springfield. The entirety of VT 143 is maintained by the town of Springfield.

Route description
Route 143 begins in the west at an intersection with Route 11 in the center of town, just east of Route 106's southern terminus.  The route heads eastward out of the town, and begins a windy journey, turning north, then east, then back to the north, and then to the northeast towards Interstate 91.  Route 143 crosses underneath I-91 without an interchange, and continues to turn ever more northward until it reaches US-5, at which point the route is facing almost directly north–south.  

This intersection is Route 143's eastern terminus, just feet from the banks of the Connecticut River and the state border with New Hampshire. These two routes, the closest major roads (aside from US-5) accessible from Route 143's eastern end, also provide the closest access to I-91, at exit 7 in the south and exit 8 in the north.

Major intersections

References

External links

143
Transportation in Windsor County, Vermont